Ludwik Bronarski (1890–1975) was a Polish musicologist.

References

External links
 

1890 births
1975 deaths
Polish musicologists
20th-century musicologists
Chopin scholars